A scale ruler is a tool for measuring lengths and transferring measurements at a fixed ratio of length; two common examples are an architect's scale and engineer's scale.  In scientific and engineering terminology, a device to measure linear distance and create proportional linear measurements is called a scale.  A device for drawing straight lines is a straight edge or ruler.  In common usage, both are referred to as a ruler.

Architect's scale

An architect's scale is a specialized ruler designed to facilitate the drafting and measuring of architectural drawings, such as floor plans and Multi-view orthographic projections. 

Because the scale of such drawings is often smaller than life-size, an architect's scale features multiple units of length and proportional length increments.

For accuracy and longevity, the material used should be dimensionally stable and durable. Scales were traditionally made of wood, but today they are usually made of rigid plastic or aluminum. Architect's scales may be flat, with 4 scales, or have asymmetric 3-lobed cross-section, with 6 or 12 scales.

United States and Imperial units
In the United States, and prior to metrication in Britain, Canada and Australasia, architect's scales are marked as a ratio of x inches-to-the-foot (typically written as x″=1′-0″). For example, one inch measured from a drawing with a scale of "one-inch-to-the-foot" is equivalent to one foot in the real world (a scale of 1:12 measured from a drawing with a scale of "two-inches-to-the-foot" is equivalent to six inches in the real world (a scale of 1:6).  It is not to be confused with a true unitless ratio. A 1:5 architectural scale (inches to feet) would be a 1:60 unitless scale (inches to inches) since there are 60 inches in 5 feet.

Typical scales used in the United States are:

 full scale, with inches, divided into sixteenths of an inch

The following scales are generally grouped in pairs using the same dual-numbered index line (one scale is read from the right, and the other scale is read from the left):
{|
|-
|three-inches-to-the-foot (3″=1′-0″) (ratio equivalent 1:4)||one-and-one-half-inch-to-the-foot (″=1′-0″) (1:8)
|-
|one-inch-to-the-foot (1″=1′-0″) (1:12)||one-half-inch-to-the-foot (″=1′-0″) (1:24)
|-
|three-quarters-inch-to-the-foot (″=1′-0″) (1:16)||three-eighths-inch-to-the-foot (″=1′-0″) (1:32)
|-
|one-quarter-inch-to-the-foot (″=1′-0″) (1:48)||one-eighth-inch-to-the-foot (″=1′-0″) (1:96)
|-
|three-sixteenths-inch-to-the-foot (″=1′-0″) (1:64)||three-thirty-seconds-inch-to-the-foot (″=1′0″) (1:128)
|}
Add History

Metric units
Architect's scale rulers used in Britain and other metric countries are marked with ratios without reference to a base unit. Therefore, a drawing will indicate both its scale (ratio) and the unit of measurement being used.

In Britain, and elsewhere, the standard units used on architectural drawings are the (SI) units millimetres (mm) and metres (m), whereas in France centimetres (cm) and metres are most often used.

In Britain, for flat rulers, the paired scales often found on architect's scales are:

1:1/1:10
1:5/1:50
1:10/1:100
1:20/1:200
1:1250/1:2500

For triangular rulers, the paired scales are:

1:1/1:10
1:2/1:20
1:5/1:50
1:100/1:200
1:500/1:1000
1:1250/1:2500

Less common scales are:

1:25/1:250
1:33
2:1

In France, in engineering departments or architectural offices, here are some scales used :

 1:100 / 1:300
 1:200 / 1:400
 1:250 / 1:500

Engineer's scale

An engineer's scale is a tool for measuring distances and transferring measurements at a fixed ratio of length. It is used in making engineering drawings, commonly called blueprints, blue lines, or plans on a specific scale. For example, "one-tenth size" would appear on a drawing to indicate a part larger than the drawing on the paper itself. It is not to be used to measure machined parts to see if they meet specifications. 

In the United States this scale is divided into decimalized fractions of an inch but has a cross-section like an equilateral triangle, which enables the scale to have six edges indexed for measurement. One edge is divided into tenths of an inch, and the subsequent ones are directly marked for twentieths, thirtieths, fortieths, fiftieths, and finally sixtieths of an inch. Referred to as 1:10, 1:20, 1:30,1:40, 1:50 or 1:60 scale. Typically in civil engineering applications, 1:10 (1″=10′) is used exclusively for detail drawings.  1:20 and 1:40 scales are used for working plans.  1:60 is normally used only to show large areas of a project.

The engineer's scale came into existence when machining parts required a greater precision than the usual, binary fractionalization of the inch, as in the architect's scale, for houses and furniture. They were used, for example, in laying out printed circuit boards with the spacing of leads from integrated circuits as one-tenth of an inch.

See also 
 Technical drawing tools
 Gerber Variable Scale

References

External links
Engineering and Architectural Scale Information

 Length, distance, or range measuring devices
 Metalworking measuring instruments